Acha (Gaelic: An t-Achadh, tranlsating to "The Field") is a small hamlet on the Scottish island of Coll.

Climate
Climate in Acha tends to be cold.

References

See also
Dùn an Achaidh, a nearby dun

Villages on Coll